Sam Harris (born 1967) is an American author, philosopher, and neuroscientist.

Sam Harris may also refer to:

 Sam Harris (basketball) (born 1984), Australian basketball player
 Sam Harris (rugby) (born 1980), New Zealand rugby footballer
 Sam Harris (singer) (born 1961), American actor and recording artist
 Sam H. Harris (1872–1941), American theater producer, theater owner, and manager
 Sam Harris (born 1988), American singer and frontman for the rock group X Ambassadors

See also
Samantha Harris (disambiguation)
Samuel Harris (disambiguation)